"Si c'était à refaire" (meaning "If I Had to Do It All Over Again") is a song recorded by Canadian singer Celine Dion, released on 14 October 2016 as the second single in France from Encore un soir (2016). The lyrics were written by Alice Guiol and the music was composed by Jacques Veneruso. Veneruso and Thierry Blanchard produced the song.

Commercial performance
In early September 2016, after the release of Encore un soir, "Si c'était à refaire" entered the French Digital Singles Chart and the French Overall Singles Chart at number 100. The single peaked at number thirty-six on the Radio Chart in France in November 2016. It became the second top forty single from Encore un soir on the French Radio Chart, where "Encore un soir" peaked at number eighteen in September 2016.

Live performances
Dion performed "Si c'était à refaire" during her 2017 tour.

Track listing
Promotional single
"Si c'était à refaire" (Radio Edit) – 3:39

Charts

Release history

References

External links

2016 singles
2016 songs
Celine Dion songs
French-language songs